Jeffrey Meredith is a college men's ice hockey coach. He had been in charge of the program at SUNY Fredonia since 1988, winning more than 400 games in that time.

Career
After graduating from SUNY Brockport with a degree in heath and physical fitness in 1982, Meredith began pursuing a master's at Ohio State University. While there, he served as an assistant for the men's ice hockey team under Jerry Welsh. After receiving a degree in Sport and Fitness Administration, Meredith became a full time assistant at Hamilton in 1984. Four years later, he was brought in to helm the year-old program at SUNY Fredonia.

Predictably, with such a new team, Meredith didn't have much success in his first year but he quickly turned the Blue Devils into winners. Fredonia posted three consecutive winning seasons in the early 90s but the best was yet to come. The Blue Devils produced one of the greatest performances in 1994, finishing the regular season with an undefeated record. Fredonia then won their conference tournament and made the program's first NCAA appearance. Fredonia's chance to join 1970 Cornell and 1984 Bemidji State as an undefeated NCAA champion ended with a 3–4 loss in the national semifinal. While the team wasn't quite unbeatable the following year, they were dual conference champions once more and marched all the way to the championship game. Fredonia was held scoreless in the match, losing 0–1.

Meredith led Fredonia to a third SUNYAC regular season crown in 1997 but the team dropped into the middle of the pack afterwards. While most results were positive, The Blue Devils didn't make another NCAA appearance until 2007. In the 2010s, the Blue Devils flagged, sinking lower and lower in the standings. They began to recover towards the end of the decade and enabled Meredith to win his 400th game in 2019.

Head Coaching Record

See also
 List of college men's ice hockey coaches with 400 wins

References

External links

Living people
Year of birth missing (living people)
Ice hockey people from New York (state)
People from Rochester, New York
State University of New York at Brockport alumni
State University of New York at Fredonia faculty